The 2020 Liberty Bowl was a college football bowl game played on December 31, 2020, with kickoff at 4:00 p.m. EST (3:00 p.m. local CST) on ESPN. It was the 62nd edition of the Liberty Bowl, and was one of the 2020–21 bowl games concluding the 2020 FBS football season. Sponsored by automotive retailer AutoZone, the game was officially known as the AutoZone Liberty Bowl.

Teams
Based on conference tie-ins, the bowl was expected to feature teams from the Southeastern Conference (SEC) and the Big 12 Conference. After a matchup of West Virginia of the Big 12 and Tennessee of the SEC was announced on December 20, the Tennessee program had to withdraw on December 21 due to positive COVID-19 testing. Army, who had accepted an invitation to the Independence Bowl before it was canceled due to a lack of available teams, was named as their replacement.

West Virginia Mountaineers

West Virginia of the Big 12 entered the Liberty Bowl with a 5–4 record, 4–4 in conference play. The Mountaineers' most recent bowl game was the 2018 Camping World Bowl, and their most recent bowl win was the 2016 Cactus Bowl (January). They had two prior appearances in the Liberty Bowl, losing in the 1964 and the 2014 editions.

Army Black Knights

Army, which competed as an independent, entered the Liberty Bowl with a 9–2 record. The Black Knights' most recent bowl game, and bowl win, was the 2018 Armed Forces Bowl. This edition marked Army’s first Liberty Bowl appearance.

Game summary

Statistics

Tyhier Tyler tied the Liberty Bowl record for rushing touchdowns, with three.

References

External links

Game statistics at statbroadcast.com

Liberty Bowl
Liberty Bowl
Liberty Bowl
Liberty Bowl
Army Black Knights football bowl games
West Virginia Mountaineers football bowl games